The Survivor or The Survivors may refer to:

Art, entertainment, and media

Audio play
 The Survivors (Doctor Who audio), audio play

Film 
 The Survivors (1979 film), a Cuban drama film
 The Survivor (1981 film), a 1981 film starring Robert Powell and Jenny Agutter
 The Survivors (1983 film), an American comedy film
 The Survivor (1996 film), a 1996 film
 The Survivor (2021 film), a 2021 film

Literature 
The Survivor, a 1940 novel by Dennis Parry
 The Survivor and Others, a 1957 collection of fantasy and horror short stories by August Derleth
 The Survivors (Godwin novel), a 1958 science fiction novel by Tom Godwin
 The Survivors, a 1968 novel by Anne Edwards
 The Survivor (Keneally novel), a 1969 novel by Thomas Keneally
 The Survivor: An Anatomy of Life in the Death Camps, a 1976 book by Terrence Des Pres
 The Survivor (Herbert novel), a 1976 horror novel by James Herbert
 The Survivors (Raven novel), a 1976 novel in the Alms for Oblivion sequence by Simon Raven
 The Survivor (Cain novel), a 2008 novel by Tom Cain
 The Survivor (Mills novel), a 2015 Mitch Rapp novel; it is the first book in the series written by Kyle Mills after the death of the previous series author, Vince Flynn
 The Survivors (Harper novel), a 2021 novel by Jane Harper

Music 
 The Survivors (Australian band), an Australian punk-rock group
 The Survivors (California band), a band that included Brian Wilson of the Beach Boys
 The Survivors (New Orleans band), a group featuring Reggie Houston
 The Survivors, a band fronted by Pegi Young
 "The Survivors", a song by Pet Shop Boys from their 1996 album Bilingual
 The Survivors Live, a live album of an impromptu concert by Johnny Cash, Carl Perkins and Jerry Lee Lewis

Television

Series
Survivor (TV series)
 Survivors (1975 TV series)
 Survivors (2008 TV series)
 Harold Robbins' The Survivors, a 1969 prime time soap opera starring Lana Turner
 The Survivor (TV series), a 1991 Hong Kong programme broadcast by Television Broadcasts Limited

Episodes
 "The Survivor" (Star Trek: The Animated Series), a 1973 television series episode
 "The Survivors" (Star Trek: The Next Generation), a 1989 television series episode
 "The Survivors" (Dark), a 2020 television series episode
 "The Survivors", second episode of the 1963–64 Doctor Who serial The Daleks

Video games 
 The Survivors (video game), a 1980s game for various home computers published by Atlantis Software

Other uses
 The Survivor (Railroad Car), built by the American Car and Foundry Company in 1926, for Jesse Woolworth

See also
 Survival (disambiguation)
 Survivor (disambiguation)